Lovers in the City is a 1995 album by Tanita Tikaram. Jennifer Warnes provided backing vocals on four tracks on the album. One of these songs, "I Might Be Crying", was released as lead single.  A video for this single was filmed in Vietnam. The album reached No. 75 in the UK charts. "I Might Be Crying" was the first single to be released from the album, and peaked at number 64 in the UK. "Wonderful Shadow" was the second single to be released and peaked at number 198 in the UK. "Yodelling Song" was the third and last single to be released and then only in some countries in continental Europe.

Track listing 
All tracks composed by Tanita Tikaram.
"I Might Be Crying"
"Bloodlines"
"Feeding the Witches"
"Happy Taxi"
"My Love Tonight"
"Lovers in the City"
"Yodelling Song"
"Wonderful Shadow"
"Women Who Cheat on the World"
"Leaving the Party"

Personnel
Tanita Tikaram – guitar, vocals
David Lindley – guitar
Jennifer Warnes – background vocals, chant
John Beasley – piano
Jim Keltner – drums
Sid Page – violin
Don Edwards – yodelling
Larry Corbett – cello
Stevie Williams – bass, percussion, drum programming
Chris Davis – saxophone
Michael Fisher – percussion, ocarina, sound effects, lujon, brass arrangement
Paul Kegg – cello
Michael Landau – electric guitar
Noel Langley – trumpet
Chris Laurence – bass
Helen Liebmann – cello
The London Session Orchestra – strings
Martin Loveday – cello
Thomas Newman – guitar, harmonica, piano, arranger, conductor, drum programming
J. Neil Sidwell – trombone
Philip Todd – saxophone soloist
Gavyn Wright – arranger, conductor, viola, string & viola arrangements
Mark Creswell – guitar
Rick Cox – guitar, drum programming
Tony Pleeth – cello
Suzie Katayama – cello
Jimmy Johnson- bass
Jean-Baptiste Mondino - photography

Charts

Notes 

1995 albums
Tanita Tikaram albums
East West Records albums